The Evansville Purple Aces men's soccer team represents the University of Evansville in the Missouri Valley Conference (MVC) of NCAA Division I soccer. The Purple Aces play their home matches on Black Beauty Field at Arad McCutchan Stadium on the north end of the university's campus in Evansville, Indiana. The team is currently coached by Marshall Ray.

History
The program began in 1974, under head coach Bill Vieth. Since then, the Purple Aces have made the NCAA Division I Men's Soccer Tournament 11 times.

1985 
Evansville first made the Final Four in 1985, under head coach Fred Schmalz. After going 21–1–2 in the regular season, the Purple Aces qualified for the NCAA tournament, a feat the program has accomplished twice up to this point. During the tournament, Evansville beat the likes of Indiana (3–0), and Penn State (1–0). It was UCLA who bested them in the Final Four, by a score of 3 to 1. The Bruins would eventually beat American to win the tournament.

1990 
Still under head coach Schmalz, the program reached the NCAA tournament for the sixth year in a row. Going 24–1–2 in the regular season, the team won the MCC championship and topped the regular season standings. During the NCAA tournament, Evansville bested Boston and Indiana, both by a score of 1–0. Rutgers would go on to beat them in the Final Four, and advance to the championship, where they lost to UCLA.

Notable players
Through the years, many Purple Aces have gone on to play professionally, and twelve have been named All-Americans for their play at Evansville.

Professional players 
(Years in parentheses denote years playing for the Purple Aces)
 Marc Burch (2002–2004), currently plays for Memphis 901 FC
 Scott Cannon (1986–1990), last played for the Tampa Bay Mutiny in 2001
 Frank D'Amelio (1978–1979), last played for New York United in 1981; assistant coach of UNLV Rebels soccer from 1998 to 2005
 Alec Dufty (2006–2008), last played for Chicago Fire; current goalkeeper coach for Sporting Kansas City
 Cory Elenio (2004–2007), currently plays for the Syracuse Silver Knights
 Mark Anthony Gonzalez (2012–2015), last played for Reno 1868 FC in 2018
 Diego Gutiérrez (1992–1993), last played for Chicago Fire in 2008; United States national
 Michael LaBerge (1994–1996), last played for the Hershey Wildcats in 2000
 Brian Loftin (1993–1994), last played for the Milwaukee Wave in 2003; United States futsal national
 Ian McGrath (2014–2017), currently playing for Scottish Championship side Queen of the South F.C.
 Richard Menjívar (2008–2009), last played for Penn FC in 2018; current El Salvador national
 Mike Mikes (1983–1986), last played for the Colorado Foxes in 2005
 Robert Paterson (1989–1990), last played for Portland Timbers in 1990
 Troy Perkins (2003), last played for Seattle Sounders FC in 2015; 2006 MLS Goal of the Year Award winner; United States national
 David Weir (1988–1992), last played for Scottish Premier League side Rangers F.C. in 2012; Managed Sheffield United F.C. in 2013; Scotland national

All-Americans 

 Shawn Beyer 1996
 Scott Cannon 1990
 Trey Harrington 1990 & 1992
 Just Jensen 1982
 Mick Lyon 1987
 Dan McHugh 1985

 Graham Merryweather 1991
 Mike Mikes 1985 & 1986
 John Nunes 1982
 Andrew Norton 1985
 Robert Paterson 1989†
 David Weir 1990

† = National Player of the Year

Record by year

Current Team

References

External links
 

 
Missouri Valley Conference men's soccer
1974 establishments in Indiana
Association football clubs established in 1974
Soccer clubs in Indiana